Manis is a genus of South Asian and East Asian pangolins, the Asiatic pangolins, from subfamily Maninae, within family Manidae.

Etymology 
Carl Linnaeus (1758) invented the Neo-Latin generic name Manis apparently as a feminine singular form of the Latin masculine plural Manes, the Ancient Roman name for a type of spirit, after the animal's strange appearance.

Taxonomy
 Subfamily: Maninae (Asiatic pangolins)
 Genus: Manis (Asiatic pangolins)
 Manis crassicaudata (Indian pangolin)
 Manis pentadactyla (Chinese pangolin)
 Manis sp. (Scale_H4 & Scale_H8)
 †Manis hungarica
 †Manis lydekkeri
 Subgenus: Paramanis
 Manis culionensis (Philippine pangolin)
 Manis javanica (Sunda pangolin)
 †Manis palaeojavanica (Giant asian pangolin)

Phylogeny
Phylogenetic position of genus Manis within family Manidae.

References

 
Mammal genera
Taxa named by Carl Linnaeus
Mammals of Asia